Ulta Beauty, Inc., formerly known as Ulta Salon, Cosmetics & Fragrance Inc. and before 2000 as Ulta3, is an American chain of beauty stores headquartered in Bolingbrook, Illinois. Ulta Beauty carries both high-end and low-end cosmetics, fragrances, nail products, bath and body products, beauty tools and haircare products. Each store also has a beauty salon.

History
Ulta was founded by Richard E. George, the former President of Osco Drug, Inc., and Terry Hanson. George left work at Osco in 1989 in order to develop a business plan for a retailer that would offer beauty products at different price levels. Other Osco executives joined George and Hanson in the business, and raised $11.5 million in venture capital. The company, initially called Ulta3, was launched in 1990, with five stores in Chicago suburbs. The name was changed from Ulta3 to Ulta at the end of 1999.

George left Ulta3 in 1995, and Hanson became the company's Chief Executive Officer. In December 1999, Lyn Kirby became the President and chief executive officer and Charles "Rick" Weber became Senior Executive Vice President, Chief Operating Officer and Chief Financial Officer. On October 25, 2007, the company became publicly traded on the NASDAQ.

In 2008, the company opened a second distribution center in Phoenix, Arizona. In 2010, Carl "Chuck" Rubin was appointed as Chief Operating Officer, President, and as a member of the board of directors.

On June 24, 2013, it was announced that Mary Dillon would be appointed as chief executive officer and a member of the Board of Directors, effective July 1, 2013. Dillon was previously the chief of U.S. Cellular and a senior executive at McDonald's and PepsiCo.

In 2020, before the COVID-19 pandemic there were 44,000 employees. As of 2021, Ulta employs approximately 37,000 people.

Operations 
Ulta Beauty offers both high-end and drugstore cosmetics, skincare, and fragrances, in addition to its own brands of beauty products and fragrances. They sell brands such as MAC Cosmetics, Kylie Cosmetics, and ColourPop cosmetics.

Ulta Beauty sales were $713.8 million for the first quarter ending in May 2014. At the end of the second quarter ending in August 2014, Ulta Beauty reported that total sales increased by 22.2 percent and comparable store sales increased 9.6 percent.

As of 2019, Ulta had stores in 48 states. A majority of Ulta Beauty stores are located in the East Coast region and in California.

In August 2021, the retail chain Target started selling Ulta's products.

Ulta's joined in the 15 Percent Pledge, which dedicates more store shelf space to Black-owned businesses.

On July 8, 2022, Ulta announced its collaboration with Allure to bring a collection of its 25,000 products to Allure’s online and offline stores. The collaboration ran from July to September 2022, and included brands such as Fenty Beauty, Drybar, Olaplex, Tula, The Ordinary, Peter Thomas Roth, CosRX, NYX, Morphe, and Beekman 1802 selected by Ulta's merchandising team.

References

External links

 

Companies based in Will County, Illinois
Companies listed on the Nasdaq
Bolingbrook, Illinois
Beauty stores
Retail companies established in 1990
Retail companies of the United States
American companies established in 1990
1990 establishments in Illinois
2007 initial public offerings